A by-election was held for the Victorian Legislative Assembly seat of Benalla on 13 May 2000. The by-election was triggered by the resignation on 12 April of Pat McNamara, the sitting member who was Deputy Premier of Victoria until the defeat of the Kennett government at the 1999 state election.

Results

References

2000 elections in Australia
Victorian state by-elections
20th century in Victoria (Australia)
2000s in Victoria (Australia)